Notable events of 2000 in webcomics.

Events

Webcomic portal Keenspot is founded.
Scott McCloud's Reinventing Comics was published on July 25.

Webcomics started

January 9 — explodingdog by Sam Brown
January 16 — The Beevnicks by Owen Dunne
January 17 — Sinfest by Tatsuya Ishida
February 14 — Greystone Inn by Brad Guigar
February 17 — Buttercup Festival by David Troupes
April 1 — Bob and George, by David Anez
April — Diesel Sweeties by Richard Stevens
April — Lethargic Lad by Greg Hyland switched from print to web
June 12 — Schlock Mercenary by Howard Tayler
June 19 — Chugworth Academy by Dave Cheung and Jamal Joseph Jr.
July 7 — Exploitation Now by Michael Poe
July 10 — GU Comics by Woody Hearn
July 25 — Chopping Block by Lee Adam Herold
July 27 — Bee by Jason Little
July 31 — Narbonic by Shaenon K. Garrity
July — Rogues of Clwyd-Rhan by Reinder Dijkhuis switched from Dutch to English
August 11 — Twisted Kaiju Theater by Sean McGuinness
August 14 — The Joy of Tech by Liza Schmalcel and Bruce Evans
August 14 — Megatokyo by Fred Gallagher and Rodney Caston
August 27 —  RPG World by Ian J
August 28 — Angst Technology by Barry Smith
September 20 — The Pain – When Will It End? by Tim Kreider
October 20 — Sosiaalisesti rajoittuneet (Socially Challenged) by Pekka Piira, Ossi Mäntylahti, and Jukka Piira
November 7 — Mac Hall by Ian McConville and Matt Boyd
November 10 — Checkerboard Nightmare by Kristofer Straub
December 1 — Little Gamers by Christian Fundin and Pontus Madsen
Dork Tower by John Kovalic switched from print to web

References

 
Webcomics by year